Samuela Bola (born 17 March 1983, in Suva) is a Fijian rugby union footballer. He plays as a flanker for the Fiji Barbarians in the Pacific Rugby Cup. He is also part of the Fiji team to the 2010 IRB Pacific Nations Cup.

External links
 Profile of Samuela Bola

1983 births
Living people
Fijian rugby union players
Fiji international rugby union players
Sportspeople from Suva
I-Taukei Fijian people
Rugby union flankers